Kambara is an extinct genus of mekosuchine crocodylian that lived during the Eocene epoch in Australia.

Description
At around 55 million years old, remains of Kambara are among the oldest Tertiary fossils found in Australia (although there are some recent Cretaceous fossils that are twice that age). Kambara is the oldest known mekosuchine. The genus name comes from an Aboriginal term meaning "crocodile".

There are currently four species of Kambara described: the type species K. murgonensis (Willis & Molnar, 1993), K. implexidens (Salisbury & Willis, 1996), K. molnari (Holt et al., 2005), and K. taraina (Buchanan, 2009). All four species have a generalised crocodylian body plan, growing to sizes similar to the modern Saltwater Crocodile, Crocodylus porosus. Kambara shows an interesting characteristic of having multiple bite patterns within the same genus. Kambara murgonensis has a near complete overbite, K. implexidens a more interlocking dentition and K. molnarai an intermediate condition. While initially thought to be the most primitive member of an Australasian radiation of mekosuchine crocodylians, recent studies (Holt, et al., 2007) have suggested that this may not be the case, and that there are at least two separate lineages in Australia.

Kambara and other mekosuchines are often thought to have been better adapted to movement on land than are living crocodilians. The degree of twisting or torsion in the humerus of Kambara is less than that of living crocodilians, and the shoulder joint of Kambara is stronger and allows for greater motion than those of modern species. However, Kambara is still thought to have been at least partially aquatic because its head is flattened like that of typical aquatic crocodilians.

Fossils have been found at the Murgon fossil site in south-eastern Queensland.

Phylogeny
A 2018 tip dating study by Lee & Yates simultaneously using morphological, molecular (DNA sequencing), and stratigraphic (fossil age) data established the inter-relationships within Crocodilia, which was expanded upon in 2021 by Hekkala et al. using paleogenomics by extracting DNA from the extinct Voay.

The below cladogram from the latest studies shows the placement of Kambara within Mekosuchinae:

References

 Buchanan, L.A. 2009. "Kambara taraina sp. nov. (Crocodylia, Crocodyloidea), a new Eocene mekosuchine from Queensland, Australia, and a revision of the genus". Journal of Vertebrate Paleontology 29 (2): 473–486.
 Holt, T. R., S. W. Salisbury, and P. M. A. Willis. 2005. A new species of mekosuchine crocodilian from the middle Palaeogene Rundle Formation, central Queensland. Memoirs of the Queensland Museum 50: 207–218.
 Holt, T. R., S. W. Salisbury, T. H. Worthy, C. Sand and A. Anderson. 2007. New material of Mekosuchus inexpectatus (Crocodylia: Mekosuchinae) from the Quaternary of New Caledonia. CAVEPS 2007, Melbourne Australia.
 Salisbury, S. W., and P. M. A. Willis. 1996. A new crocodylian from the early Eocene of south-eastern Queensland and a preliminary investigation of the phylogenetic relationships of crocodyloids. Alcheringa 20: 179–226.
 Willis, P. M. A., R. E. Molnar, and J. D. Scanlon. 1993. An early Eocene crocodilian from Murgon, southeastern Queensland. Kaupia 3: 27–33.

External links
 

Mekosuchinae
Eocene crocodylomorphs
Crocodiles of Australia
Prehistoric pseudosuchian genera